Küçük Tavşan island (literally "little rabbit island") is a Turkish island located in the Aegean Sea north of Gölköy, in Bodrum.

References

Islands of Turkey
Islands of Muğla Province